Pillai of Pallichal is a title of the order of nobility in Travancore. The holders of the title held the lands of the Padmanabhaswamy Temple. The most notorious holder of the title, whose given name is disputed, was executed by King Marthanda Varma in the 1750s and relations banished.

Their absolute powers declined since the seizure of power and the creation of the state of Travancore under royal authority by King Marthanda Varma in the 1750s.

See also
 Jenmi
 Zamindar
 Odanad
 Pulleri Illathu Madhusoodanan Thangal 
 Mannarghat Nair

References 

Travancore royal family